Chrostosoma tabascensis is a moth of the subfamily Arctiinae. it was described by Harrison Gray Dyar Jr. in 1916. It is found in Guatemala and Mexico.

References

BOLD Systems

Chrostosoma
Moths described in 1916